Henry M. Rosenberg (known also as Henry Mortikar Rosenberg) (February28, 1858 December24, 1947) was a painter whose style varied from realism to tonalism, symbolism and impressionism, as well as a printmaker and educator. He was Principal of the Victoria School of Art and Design (now known as NSCAD) from 1898 to 1910. Writers on the history of art in Nova Scotia call him the "grand old man of Nova Scotian art".

Career
Rosenberg, a first generation Polish-American by birth, was born in New Brunswick, New Jersey, and grew up in Chicago where he first studied art. He then travelled with his teacher Frank Duveneck and other students to Munich (1878), Paris and Florence (1879), and Venice (1880), and studied informally with James McNeill Whistler, during the summer of 1880 in Venice. Whistler interested him in etching, as well as in tonal painting which Rosenberg echoed in paintings later. Also during the five years Rosenberg was closely associated with John Singer Sargent and Arthur B. Davies. Rosenberg also worked at Pont-Aven with Gauguin. He exhibited at the Paris Salon in 1885.

After five years abroad, he moved back to Chicago where he worked on the huge panorama of the Battle of Gettysburg and shared a studio with artist Warren Davis. Then he moved to New York, where he opened a studio and associated with American
impressionists known as "The Eight". He contributed to the first exhibition at the Macbeth Gallery in New York opened by William Macbeth in 1892 to exhibit only American paintings, and in two subsequent exhibitions exhibitions. He also showed his work at the Pennsylvania Academy of Fine Arts, the Boston Art Club, the Art Institute of Chicago and the Brooklyn Art Association. During his time in New York, he worked at the artists' colony at Arkville, New York in the Catskills. In 1896, he moved to Halifax, Nova Scotia, where he became Principal of the Victoria School of Art and Design (now known as NSCAD) from 1898 to 1910.

As principal, Rosenberg sought to improve the school as a training place for those concerned with the aesthetic value of art, not commercial art or applied graphic design. In 1903, he succeeded in moving the school to a larger, more well-known building, and in 1908 he became a charter member of the Nova Scotia Museum of Fine Arts (now the Art Gallery of Nova Scotia). In 1909, he married heiress Emily Scarfe and when her father, the town mayor, died, the couple settled into Edgemere, a Victorian mansion in Dartmouth. He resigned as Principal in 1910. After his resignation he continued to teach at the Victoria School of Art & Design as a special instructor in lithography and to paint in Halifax and Dartmouth, spending summers in Citronelle, Alabama, until 1934 when his wife passed away and he retired to Citronelle. He died in Citronelle, Alabama on the 24 December 1947.

Selected exhibitions
Pennsylvania Academy of Fine Arts (1883, 1891, and 1895 annual exhibitions);
Paris Salon (1885), exhibited Consolation;
Paintings, water colors and pastels by H.M. Rosenberg and Edward L. Field, on exhibition: Feb. 16-27, 1886 by Chase's Gallery; 
Boston Art Club (1888, 1891, 1895-96 annual exhibitions);
Brooklyn Art Association (1891 annual exhibition);
Art Institute of Chicago (1891, 1894 and 1897 annual exhibitions);
first exhibition at the Macbeth Gallery, New York, opened by William Macbeth to exhibit only American paintings (1892), and in two subsequent exhibitions exhibitions;
Royal Canadian Academy (annual exhibitions, 1905-1921);
Art Association of Montreal (spring exhibition, 1906);
Ontario Society of Artists (annual exhibitions, 1915-1923);
Nova Scotia Society of Artists (annual exhibitions, 1930-1935); 
Reinvention : the art and life of H.M. Rosenberg, curated by Mora Dianne O'Neill (2012);
Canada and Impressionism: New Horizons, travelling exhibition (2020-2022)

Selected public collections
Art Gallery of Nova Scotia;
Dalhousie University, Halifax;
Dartmouth Heritage Museum, N.S.;
Delaware Art Museum;
Mobile Museum of Art;
National Gallery of Canada;
Nova Scotia Museum, Halifax

References

Bibliography

1858 births
1947 deaths
Canadian male painters
American male artists
American artists
19th-century Canadian painters
20th-century Canadian painters
Canadian landscape painters
19th-century American painters
20th-century American painters
American landscape painters
American Impressionist painters
American emigrants to Canada
Canadian art educators
Jewish American artists
Jewish painters
20th-century American Jews
Canadian Impressionist painters
19th-century American male artists
20th-century American male artists
19th-century Canadian male artists
20th-century Canadian male artists
Academic staff of NSCAD University